The King Edward VII's Hospital for Officers (KEVII) was established first as Sister Agnes' hospital in 1899 by Sister Agnes, and was then formally opened as King Edward VII's Hospital for Officers in 1904 by King Edward VII, who selected and appointed the first honorary medical staff. In 1914, Sister Agnes compiled a list of 23 honorary physicians and surgeons just a few days before the First World War. Although open to all London consultants, at that time, the status of the medical staff on the list was considered such that patients rarely requested the service from any other London physician or surgeon. The list was abandoned in 1919 and reinstated when the new hospital opened in Beaumont Street in 1948.

Closely associated with the Royal Family, the hospital was noted around the time of its centenary, to have in its list of physicians and surgeons around 100 staff, which required the inclusion of the Royal Medical Household. In 2018 there were 300 physicians and surgeons at the hospital working under a "practising privileges agreement", granted after the consultant selection and review committee (CSRC) approve and invite a consultant.

1904 list

The King Edward VII's Hospital was established first as Sister Agnes' hospital in 1899 by Sister Agnes, and then formally opened as King Edward VII's Hospital for Officers in 1904 by King Edward VII. The hospital's honorary medical staff were first selected and appointed by the King. On 6 July 1904 Buckingham palace released a list of the honorary medical staff, headed by Sir Frederick Treves, who is credited with saving the King's life by performing an operation on his appendix, and Sir Thomas Smith who was present at that operation. Both were Serjeant Surgeons to the King.

1905 list
Additions were made in 1905.

1906 list
Additions were made in 1906.

1914 list
A few days before the onset of the First World War, during which the hospital was located at 9 Grosvenor Gardens, Sister Agnes compiled a list of 23 honorary physicians and surgeons. Although patients could "if desired be treated by any member of the surgical staff of a London hospital", at that time, the status of the medical staff was considered such that patients rarely requested the service from any other London consultant. Throughout the war, all worked at the hospital without a fee.  According to historian Richard Hough "to work for the sovereign and Sister Agnes was sufficient, indeed a privilege". Arthur H. Cheatle, G. Lenthal Cheatle, John Lockhart-Mummery and Sir William Hale-White, from the 1904 list remained on the 1914 list.

1948 at Beaumont Street
In 1919, when the hospital returned to 17 Grosvenor Crescent, having been at Grosvenor Gardens throughout the war, the consultant list was abandoned. However, once located at the purpose-developed Beaumont Street in 1948, the King's Fund advised that one was necessary, and with modest charges, the consultants would acquire the prestige of being on the list. 27 physicians and surgeons were subsequently invited by the medical members of the hospital's council.

1950s -1960s
In 1954 there were 28 physicians and surgeons on the list of medical staff. From January 1965, the use of the hospital was restricted to those consultants from the recognised list. In 1969, upon the retirement of Matron Alice Saxby, eight new appointments were made.

Later years
By the early 1990s, the hospital had increased bed capacity to 62 and its medical and surgical staff numbered 87.

21st Century
The historian Richard Hough, in his book Sister Agnes (1998) described the hospital near the turn of the 21st century as "effectively the Royal Family's hospital" and as result "requires the Household's medical staff to be on the list. The list of consultants totalled near 100 at the hospital's centenary. In 2018 there were 300 physicians and surgeons at the hospital working under a "practising privileges agreement", granted after the consultant selection and review committee (CSRC) approve and invite a consultant.

References

Bibliography
Hough, Richard (1998). Sister Agnes: The History of King Edward VII's Hospital for Officers 1899-1999. London: John Murray.

External links
 

King Edward VII's Hospital
King Edward VII's Hospital for Officers